Doublesix was a subsidiary of Kuju Entertainment based in Guildford that develops video games for the digital download market. The studio was formed from the team that made Geometry Wars: Galaxies. They also made the zombie themed shooter, Burn Zombie Burn!. The company has received awards and nominations since its inception; notably that of the develop "Best New UK Studio 2008" and a nomination for best hand-held game (Geometry Wars: Galaxies) at the 2009 BAFTAs. They also worked on a successor to Burn Zombie Burn!, entitled All Zombies Must Die!.

References

External links

British companies established in 2007
Defunct video game companies of the United Kingdom
Video game development companies
Video game companies established in 2007
Companies based in Guildford